The Kam dwarf hamster (Cricetulus kamensis) is a species of rodent in the family Cricetidae. It is found only in the mountains of western China where it inhabits grassland, shrubby marshes and steppes. Although it has a limited range, the International Union for Conservation of Nature has assessed its conservation status as being of "least concern".

Description
The dorsal fur is dark greyish-brown, sometimes spotted or streaked with black, the underparts are greyish white and there is a wave-like transition where the two colours meet. The tail is thick and well-covered with guard hairs, having a dark stripe at the top and otherwise being white, with a wholly white tip.

Distribution and habitat
The Kam dwarf hamster is endemic to western China where it is found in the Tibet Autonomous Region and the provinces of Qinghai, Gansu and Xinjiang. Its typical habitat is upland grasslands, shrubby marshes and open steppe.

Behaviour
The Kam dwarf hamster is active by both day and night. It digs a simple burrow that may extend  beneath the surface and which includes nesting areas and chambers to store food for use in winter. It forages for grain and seeds and also eats insects. Breeding takes place between May and August, peaking between June and July. Litter size is usually seven or eight, but ranges from five to ten.

Status
The Kam dwarf hamster has a limited range but is thought to have a large total population. The population trend is unknown, but no particular threats have been identified and it may be present in some protected areas. The International Union for Conservation of Nature has therefore assessed the hamster's conservation status as being of "least concern".

References

Musser, G. G. and M. D. Carleton. 2005. Superfamily Muroidea. pp. 894–1531 in Mammal Species of the World a Taxonomic and Geographic Reference. D. E. Wilson and D. M. Reeder eds. Johns Hopkins University Press, Baltimore.

Cricetulus
Endemic fauna of China
Rodents of China
Mammals described in 1903
Taxa named by Konstantin Satunin
Taxonomy articles created by Polbot